John Sonsini (born 1950) is an artist based in Los Angeles. Sonsini was born in Rome, New York, he is a painter working with oils.  His best known work is portraits of Latino day labourers. Sonsini offered his subjects their usual wage in exchange for sitting for the paintings.  He has also made work based on gay male erotica.

Selected exhibitions

2015

John Sonsini , Patrick Painter Gallery, Santa Monica

2006

New Paintings, ACME., Los Angeles

2005

John Sonsini, Anthony Grant Gallery, New York

Cerca Series: John Sonsini, Museum of Contemporary Art, San Diego

2002

John Sonsini, Peter Blake Gallery, Laguna Beach

L.A. Post Cool, The San Jose Museum of Art, San Jose

1999

Gabriel, New Paintings, Dan Bernier Gallery, Dan Bernier, Los Angeles

1995

Dan Bernier Gallery, Santa Monica

1986

Newspace Gallery, Los Angeles

References

External links
Further information from Cheim & Read
Images, texts and biography from the Saatchi Gallery
Images and information from ACME Los Angeles
Press Release for Patrick Painter, Inc.  
Link to exhibited work at Patrick Painter, Inc. 

American artists
1950 births
Living people
People from Rome, New York